The Captaincies of Brazil were captaincies of the Portuguese Empire, administrative divisions and hereditary fiefs of Portugal in the colony of Terra de Santa Cruz, later called Brazil, on the Atlantic coast of northeastern South America. Each was granted to a single donee, a Portuguese nobleman who was given the title captain General.

Beginning in the early 16th century, the Portuguese monarchy used proprietorships or captaincies—land grants with extensive governing privileges—as a tool to colonize new lands. Prior to the grants in Brazil, the captaincy system had been successfully used in territories claimed by Portugal—-notably including Madeira, the Azores, and other Atlantic islands.

In contrast to the generally successful Atlantic captaincies, of all the captaincies of Brazil, only two, the captaincies of Pernambuco and São Vicente (later called São Paulo), are today considered to have been successful. For reasons varying from abandonment, defeat by aboriginal tribes, occupation of Northeast Brazil by the Dutch West India Company, and death of the donatário (lord proprietor) without an heir, all of the proprietorships (captaincies) eventually reverted to or were repurchased by the crown.

They were effectively subsumed by the Governorates General and the States of Brazil and Maranhão starting in 1549, and the last of the privately granted captaincies reverted to the Crown in 1754. Their final boundaries in the latter half of the 18th century became the basis for the provinces of Brazil.

Establishment as colonies

Following the successful expedition of Martim Afonso de Sousa in 1530, in order to exploit the trade in brazilwood discovered on the Atlantic coast, as well as explore rumors of vast riches in silver and gold in the interior, the Portuguese Crown determined to establish permanent colonies in their claim on the new continent. The Portuguese realized that they had no human or financial resources to invest in a large and distant colony, and decided to enlist private entrepreneurs, called donatários. Each would become owner and administrator of a capitania or captaincy, a land grant. This system had previously been successful in settling of the Portuguese colonies, first in Madeira, the Azores and various islands mostly along the coast of Africa. 

The first captaincies were drawn in strips parallel to the equator, commencing at the Atlantic coast and terminating in the west at the Tordesillas Line (where Spanish territory began). They were established by King John III of Portugal in 1534. Within a system of royal patronage and nepotism, five of the captaincies were given to two cousins of finance minister António de Ataíde: Martim Afonso de Sousa and his brother Pero Lopes. An additional captaincy was issued to Pero de Gois, captain of Afonso's 1530 expedition. The remaining captaincies were granted to a trusted mixture of military men (more precisely called conquistadores) and court bureaucrats.

Each captaincy was to be of fifty leagues "height" (measured north-south), but in practice, boundaries were marked by pairs of rivers, a plethora of which emptied into the Atlantic Ocean on the northeastern coast of the continent. So actual heights varied, as shown in the map at right. Initially fifteen, they were granted to twelve donees. They were the following (north to south):

All but four captaincies failed, due to inadequate resources of the donees and lack of support from the Crown. Four donees failed to take possession of their lands, and four more quickly succumbed to Indians. Only four captaincies survived past 1549: São Vicente, Pernambuco, Ilhéus and Porto Seguro.

Subordination of the Captaincies
The history of the captaincies is turbulent, reflecting the needs of the Kings of Portugal, a small European country, to colonize and govern an enormous expanse of South America. Throughout the early colonial era Captaincies were granted, divided, subordinated, annexed, and abandoned.  In 1548 when the captaincy of Baía de Todos os Santos (Bahia) reverted to the Crown due to the massacre, by indigenous cannibals, of its donee, Francisco Pereira Coutinho and his settlers; the King, Dom João III, established a royal governor (later a governor-general) at Bahia. At the same time Dom João rescinded some of the expansive privileges he had previously granted the donatarios (lords-proprietor). However, clearly demonstrating the crowns desire to accommodate whatever worked, Dom João instructed his first Governor to visit all the remaining captaincies, except for Pernambuco, the one singularly successful captaincy. In fact no royal governor visited Pernambuco until the Seventeenth Century. The captaincies continued to exist as governments subordinate to the royal governors, governors-general, and viceroys. All captaincies, sooner or later, reverted to being royal rather than proprietary captaincies (variously thru some failure or repurchase by the crown).

During the Philippine Dynasty, some of the captaincies attained the status of provinces with royal governors (i.e. "states"), and Portuguese Brazil thereafter was a mixture of donatary captaincies, royal captaincies and states.

List of post-1549 captaincies

Some complications result from captaincies being merged and recreated with the same name, but representing altered regions.  At least a few of the later captaincies were islands or capes of negligible size. Dates are of independent captaincies; in some cases, new captaincies were created as administrative divisions or subcaptaincies of existing ones before becoming fully independent (i.e. Para was established as early as 1616 as a north and westward annex of Maranhão).
 Fernando de Noronha (not occupied or abandoned) 1504-1737
 Itaparica and Itamarandiba (islands), 1556, split from Bahia
 Rio de Janeiro, 1563, renamed first (northern) section of São Vicente + Paraiba do Sul(?)
 Paraguaçu, 1566, carved from Bahia
 Paraíba, 1580, created from part of Rio Grande, enlarged by acquisition of most of Itamaracá, 1585
 Rio Grande de Norte, 1597, merger of northern portion of Rio Grande, Ceara and Maranhão
 Cabo Frio, 1615, promontory in Rio de Janeiro
 Pará, ~1616 as division of Maranhão from newly incorporated territory west of the Tordesillas Line; independent in 1652
 Itapecuru (renamed Icatu after 1691), 1621
 Caeté (originally Captaincy of Vera Cruz de Gurupi), 1622, merged into Maranhão 1654
 Itanheim, 1624
 Paranaguá, 1624
 Paraíba do Sul (originally São Tomé), 1629
 Gurupa, 1633
 Santa Cruz de Cametá, within Grão-Para on the lower Amazon, 1633 (see Cametá)
 Rio São Francisco, ~1634
 Cabo Norte, 1637, from newly incorporated territory; merged into Maranhão 1654
 Vigia, 1652
 Ilha Grande (island of Marajo), 1665, merged into Maranhão
 Xingu, 1685, within Maranhão
 Ararobá, 1690, within Pernambuco
 São Paulo and Minas de Ouro, 1709, renamed from São Vicente
 Minas Gerais, 1720, split from São Paulo and Minas de Ouro
 São Paulo, 1720, remaining after Minas Gerais split
 Mearim, 1723, within Maranhão
 Cuma, 1727, sub-captaincy split from Maranhão;
 Santa Catarina, 1739, split from São Paulo
 Goiaz, 1748, split from São Paulo
 Mato Grosso, 1748, split from São Paulo
 São José de Rio Negro (most of Amazonia region), 1755, split from Pará
 Grão-Pará, 1755, renamed portion of Pará after Rio Negro split
 Piauí, 1759, split from Maranhão
 Espírito Santo, 1799, independent from Bahia
 Rio Grande do Sul, 1760, newly incorporated territory of Rio Grande de São Pedro
 Ceará, 1799, split from Pernambuco
 Rio Grande do Norte, 1808, split from Pernambuco
 Alagoas, 1817, split from Pernambuco
Colônia de Caiena e Guiana, 1809, annexation of French Guiana
 Sergipe, 1820, split from Bahia

Pernambuco and São Vicente 

The Captaincy of Pernambuco thrived due to sugarcane plantations.  The Captaincy of São Vicente, called São Paulo after the city of São Paulo became its capital in 1681, obtained success through the exploration of the hinterland known as bandeiras.  In 1621, these became the basis for the southeastern State of Brazil.

Provinces of Brazil
In 1815, the State of Brazil was elevated to a kingdom and all existing provinces and Crown captaincies became provinces of the United Kingdom of Portugal, Brazil and the Algarves.

Legacy of the Captaincies
Thirteen modern states have names of their predecessor captaincies, and several cities.  The captaincies immortalized a set of Tupi-guarani place names, chiefly those of rivers and mountains.

In echoes of the feudal system of landed noblemen, the huge fazendas of the 18th and 19th centuries were allocated from the land holdings of the captaincies.

Brazil today still lives with the legacy of a plantation culture that employed 4million African slaves and concentrated land ownership. An elite 1.7percent of the landowners continue to own nearly half the arable land; the top 10percent of the nation earns half the income.

See also
 Captaincy General
 Provinces of Brazil

Notes

References

 
1534 establishments in Brazil
1549 disestablishments in Brazil